At the 1997 Pan Arab Games, the athletics events were held at the Camille Chamoun Sports City Stadium in Beirut, Lebanon from 14 to 17 July. The events were poorly attended, with the vast majority of seat in the stadium remaining empty even on the final day. However, the calibre of performances remained high in spite of this.

Originally scheduled for 1996, the games were delayed due to rebuilding efforts after war with Israel – efforts that were themselves hampered by Operation Grapes of Wrath, which targeted areas in Beirut one year earlier. Iraqi athletes did not compete for a second time running, due to regional opposition of its Invasion of Kuwait. At the games, drug tests came back positive for some athletes – a first for the competition. As a result of the rescheduling, the dates for the athletics somewhat overlapped with those of the athletics at the 1997 Mediterranean Games. Future Pan Arab Games were scheduled in the year before the Summer Olympics to avoid similar clashes of the regional events, which are attended by several of the same nations. The first day of the athletics was marred by disqualification of four sprinters (from Morocco and Algeria), who had pushed one another.

A total of 41 events were contested, of which 22 by male and 19 by female athletes. Three new women's events were introduced – the triple jump and the half marathon were entirely new, while the 3000 metres event was replaced by the 5000 metres (coming into line with global standard set at the 1995 World Championships in Athletics). The rest of the programme was similar to that of the 1992 Pan Arab Games, although racewalking events were dropped for both men and women on this occasion. The road races, held on the first day of the games, encountered traffic problems: men's bronze medallist Ahmad Adam was hit by the referee's car and a women's medallist complained that the general public driving on the same road had made her run difficult.

Morocco topped the medal table with thirteen gold medals. Qatar and Algeria each won eight gold medals, the former doing so entirely in the men's section and the latter being most successful in the women's competition. Baya Rahouli was the most successful athlete of the tournament, with the 17-year-old winning four golds in the women's section (100 metres, 100 metres hurdles, long jump and triple jump). Two other athletes won multiple individual titles: Ibrahim Ismail Muftah won a men's 200 metres/400 metres double and Nadia Zétouani won both the women's 400 metres flat and 400 metres hurdles events. The women's high jump was won by a 14-year-old, Hamida Benhocine of Algeria.

Medal summary

Men

Women

See also
1997 Arab Athletics Championships
1997 World Championships in Athletics
Athletics at the 1997 Mediterranean Games

References

Results
Wamelink, Marcel. 1997 Pan Arab Games Results. Sports Results. Retrieved on 2015-04-19.
 Al Batal Al Arabi(N°:45). Arab Athletics Union. Retrieved on 2015-04-19.

External links
Coverage of the Games by the Associated Press

1997 Pan Arab Games
Pan Arab Games
1997
International athletics competitions hosted by Lebanon
Events at Camille Chamoun Sports City Stadium